Maaike Kito Lebbing,  known professionally as Kito, is an Australian record producer, songwriter and DJ currently based in Los Angeles, California. Kito originally debuted in 2009 on Skream's record label Disfigured Dubz. After independently releasing an EP in 2018 called Haani, Lebbing debuted under Astralwerks/Capitol, releasing singles featuring Empress Of, AlunaGeorge, Fletcher, Zhu and Jeremih. She has created official remixes for Beyoncé's "Run the World (Girls)" (2011), Broods' "Too Proud" (2019) and Wafia's "Flowers and Superpowers" (2019), and produced music for musicians such as Mabel, Jorja Smith, Banks and Ruel, and in 2019 was nominated for the Breakthrough Songwriter of the Year (Los Angeles) at the 2020 Global APRA Music Awards.

Between 2011 and 2014, Lebbing released music as a part of the duo Kito & Reija Lee, as well as a collaborative EP with Feadz entitled Electric Empire (2012). She has had her productions sampled and used in songs by America rap artists Trinidad James, Big Boi, T.I. and Ludacris.

Biography 

Lebbing grew up in the small town of Denmark, Western Australia, and first began producing music as a teenager using FruityLoops. At 17, Lebbing moved to Perth to study fashion, however soon quit and began working at a record store while studying music for a year at TAFE. Lebbing began working as a DJ at nightclubs in Perth, and in 2006 travelled to Europe for a year, which led her to develop a love of dubstep and inspired her to become a full-time musician.

In 2008, she debuted her first releases through Skream's Disfigured Dubz label. Lebbing later sent demos of hers which she had created with friend and vocalist Reija Lee to producer Diplo on MySpace, which caused him to sign them to his label Mad Decent as a duo. Kito & Reija Lee relocated to London in 2011, releasing their debut extended play Sweet Talk in the same year, as well as remixing Beyoncé's "Run the World (Girls)". Lebbing collaborated with Feadz in 2012 on the EP Electric Empire, and in 2013, rapper Trinidad James sampled the group's song "Run for Cover" for his song "Females Welcomed", which was also later used as a sample for Big Boi, T.I. and Ludacris' song "King Shit". The group released a second EP in 2014, II, however disbanded in 2015. Lebbing remained in London and worked as a producer, creating songs for musicians such as Mabel, and worked on Jorja Smith's 2018 debut album Lost & Found.

After a break-up in 2017, Lebbing moved back to her hometown in Western Australia, and recorded her second solo EP, Haani. The EP, released in the following year, featured collaborations with musicians such as Elley Duhé, Broods and Hudson Mohawke. She soon relocated to Los Angeles, and after signing to Astralwerks/EMI Music Australia released "Wild Girl", a collaboration with Empress Of, soon followed by "Alone with You" featuring AlunaGeorge.

In 2019, Kito was nominated for the Breakthrough Songwriter of the Year (Los Angeles) at the 2020 Global APRA Music Awards.

In September 2022, Kito released "Sad Girl Music" featuring Banks.

Artistry 

Lebbing was influenced by her mother's love of Kate Bush as a child, as well as DJ Shadow's Endtroducing..... (1996) and Dr. Octagon's Dr. Octagonecologyst (1996) which were introduced to her by her sister. As a teenager, Lebbing primarily listened to drum and bass and hip hop, and cites Burial as one of the dubstep musicians who influenced her love of the genre.

Discography

Extended plays

Singles

Remixes

Guest appearances and production credits

References

External links
 Official Website
 Kito at SoundCloud
 Kito at Facebook

Living people
21st-century Australian women musicians
21st-century Australian musicians
Australian electronic musicians
Australian DJs
Australian record producers
Australian women in electronic music
Drum and bass musicians
Dubstep musicians
Electro musicians
Electronic dance music DJs
People from Denmark, Western Australia
Musicians from Perth, Western Australia
Year of birth missing (living people)
Remixers